Andreas Heinecke is a social entrepreneur and the creator of Dialogue in the Dark. He is the first Ashoka fellow for Western Europe and a Schwab Foundation for Social Entrepreneurship Global Fellow. He is the founder of Dialogue Social Enterprise, and an honorary professor and Chair of Social Business at the EBS University of Business and Law, Wiesbaden, Germany.

Early life and background
Heinecke was born in Baden-Baden (Germany) on December 24, 1955. He studied History and Literature at Pädagogische Hochschule Heidelberg from 1977 to 1982, and was awarded a PhD in Philosophy by Goethe University Frankfurt in 1989.

Members of his mother's family were victims of the Holocaust while his father's side were both passive and active supporters of the Nazi regime. As a child, he grew up with the very palpable tension, misunderstanding, and even fear that existed across these human borders. It was not until he was 13 years old that he learned that his Jewish relatives had been murdered and that his mother had lost much of her family in world war two.

This realization that he had both Jewish and Nazi-German ancestry made him question human behaviour.

Career
Heinecke started his career as a journalist and documentary maker at Südwestfunk, a German public broadcaster, in the 1980s. He was asked to organize training for a 28-year-old journalist who had lost his eyesight in a car accident. At first, he did not know what kind of work he could assign him and felt awkward. He never had met a blind person before. Heinecke started to realize that his pity was misplaced. Being blind is another form of life and contains lots of capabilities. The blind journalist showed him how to cope with fundamental changes in life and unleashed a complete new dimension to perceive our day-to-day world without vision. He had great influence on Heinecke and forced him to question what makes a truly valuable life. Heinecke got an insight into what a world without sight would be.

After the work training was successfully finished, Heinecke switched jobs and began working with the Stiftung Blindenanstalt Frankfurt (Foundation for the Blind). This gave him a platform to train other blind people to work within radio stations. He understood that blind people are excluded from lots of information and started several initiatives to close this gap. The first electronic newspaper in Germany and digital reference books or databases with job announcement were realized under his leadership. 
In his work, he started to realize that the most significant problem was not in serving „them“, but in fact in breaking down the barriers between those who were blind and those who were not. Ensuring that a blind person had a full life meant finding a way to make sighted people not fear and shun them. The idea for Dialogue in the Dark and subsequent programs grew, and he left the Foundation in 1995 to be able to be more entrepreneurial.

He has since devoted himself to finding new ways to bridge the gaps across human divides through direct human experience. Together with his wife, Orna Cohen, Dialogue in Silence and Dialogue with Time were created. Heinecke is a serial social entrepreneur and founded several social enterprises as Consens GmbH (1999), DialogMuseum GmbH (2004), Schattensprache GmbH (2006) or Dialogue Social Enterprise (2009).

Social entrepreneurship
Dialogue in the Dark was launched in Frankfurt in 1988. Since then, numerous Dialogue in the Dark exhibitions and business workshops have evolved worldwide and are established independently through a social franchise-system. More than 7 million visitors and participants have taken part. In 1997 Dialogue in Silence was created as complimentary experience in total silence where participants discover a repertoire of non-verbal expression with the help of hearing impaired guides and trainers.

In 2009, Heinecke founded the Dialogue Social Enterprise GmbH to establish an umbrella for current and future projects, the latest one being Dialogue with Time. Created together with his wife Orna Cohen and opened in Israel in August 2012. The exhibition guides are seniors from 70 years up and visitors experience aging and can enter to a dialogue of generations.

Dialogue in the Dark

Dialogue in the Dark in an experience where groups of visitors are led by blind guides through specially constructed dark rooms in which scent, sounds, wind, temperature and textures convey the characteristics of daily environments like that of a park, a city, a boat cruise or a bar. This reverses the typical roles: the blind guides are very aware of the environment and the visitors are taken out of their comfort zone.

Dialogue in Silence
Dialogue in Silence is an exhibition held in a sound proof environment where visitors are made to communicate through signs. Various installations at the exhibition promote non-verbal communication like facial expression, gestures and body language. The objective of the exhibition is similar to that of Dialogue in the Dark in the sense that it promotes exclusion of familiarity of environment and promotes effective communication.
Another aim of Dialogue in the Dark is to address disability by one, creating jobs for the deaf and second by creating empathy towards non-hearing people by recreating “disability” as an experience for the able people.

Dialogue with Time
Dialogue with Time tries to bring a perceptive change about old people. The objective is that the younger generation starts to think differently about senior citizens. The first Dialogue with time was presented in 2012 at Holon Children's Museum in Israel.
The exhibition is conducted with help of guides over 70 years of age who act as role models and mediators as they are knowledgeable in facets of ageing.

Dialogue Social Enterprise
Dialogue Social Enterprise is a company with limited liability (GmbH) and was established in 2009 by Heinecke and his long-term partners Orna Cohen, Laura Gorni, Klara Kletzka and Thomas Rochter. It is an international firm with people from 6 countries to disseminate the various Dialogue exhibitions and workshops through consultation. DSE is the licensor of the Dialogue trade marks and the center organization of the international network of partners.

Social entrepreneurship education
Heinecke took a Professorship at the Danone Chair of Social Business at the European Business School in Wiesbaden, Germany in 2011. He is working towards integrating “Dialogue in the Dark” in business school education for imparting social literacy. 
As described in a concept paper by Heinecke “our objective is to not only rethink business education: it is also to redesign business behaviour. It is also to change the understanding towards people who are marginalized by society, specifically those with disabilities. Dialogue Social Enterprise focuses on the potential rather than deficit, ability rather than disability and is a real-time example of an inclusive world. It is our endeavour to leverage this model to help other key stakeholders in society to bring inclusivity in their thinking, and bring about a transformation of business behaviour.”

Awards
 In 1998, Stevie Wonder Vision Award in New York
 In 2004, Best Practice in Universal Design in Tokyo
 In 2005, First Ashoka Fellow in Western Europe
 In 2006, Deutscher Unternehmerpreis (Category Sustainable Entrepreneurship)
 In 2007, Outstanding Global Social Entrepreneur by the Schwab Foundation, Geneva
 In 2008, Member of the World Economic Forum's Global Agenda Council on Social Entrepreneurship
 In 2009, Global Award Winner for the best Innovative and out-of-comfort-zone event by the YPO
 In 2009, Dragon Award for the category “Business with Conscience”, Dalian
 In 2011, Deutscher Gründerpreis in Berlin

Selected publications
 Heinecke, Andreas (1990): Das Ostjudentum im Werk von José Orabuena. Frankfurt am Main: Lang (Europäische Hochschulschriften Reihe 1, 1182)
 Heinecke, Andreas (2007): Public-Private-Partnership, öffentlicher Dienst und soziales Unternehmertum. Chancen und Risiken. In: Achleitner, Ann-Kristin (Ed.): Finanzierung von Sozialunternehmern. Konzepte zur finanziellen Unterstützung von Social Entrepreneurs. Stuttgart: Schäffer-Poeschel (Handelsblatt-Bücher),  pp. 160–167
 Heinecke, Andreas (2008): Jenseits der Dinge. Zur Gegenständlichkeit des Immateriellen. In: Deutsche Arbeitsschutzausstellung; Bundesanstalt für Arbeitsschutz und Arbeitsmedizin (Ed.): Szenografie in Ausstellungen und Museen. Essen: Klartext, pp. 18–27
 Heinecke, Andreas (2009): Dialogue in the Dark. In: Earl Steele, Philip; Obem, Anna; Starzyńska, Dorota (Ed./Ashoka Publication): Creating Change. Innovations in the World of Disability. Warschau, Friends of Integration Association, pp. 46–51,
 Heinecke, Andreas (2009): Dialog im Dunkeln – Ausstellungen als soziale Unternehmen. In: Rousseau, Manuela und Reifurth, Katharina: Fundraising- Management, Methoden und Instrumente. KMM Hamburg. Institut für Kultur- und Medienmanagement p. 252-262
 Co-author and led by Heinecke (2011): The Social Investment Manual A Guide for Social Entrepreneurs
 Co-author and led by Heinecke (2012): Governance of Social Enterprises A guidebook to corporate governance of social enterprises
 Heinecke, A., (2012), Why Can You Not Do Good and Earn Well? Social Entrepreneurs Caught in a Moral Conflict, in Corporate Governance in the New Normal, SID Conference Paper
 Heinecke, A. & Mayer, J. (2012), Strategies for Scaling in Social Entrepreneurship, in: Social Entrepreneurship and Social Business, Volkmann C., Tokarski K.O., Ernst, K. (Editors), 191-209

References

Ashoka Fellows
1955 births
Living people
German disability rights activists
People from Baden-Baden